The Judo competition at the 1997 Mediterranean Games was held in Bari, Italy from 24 June 1997.

Medal overview

Men

Women

Medal table

References
Results of the 1997 Mediterranean Games (JudoInside.com)

1997
Sports at the 1997 Mediterranean Games
Mediterranean Games
Judo competitions in Italy